RWA may refer to:

Organizations

Race Walking Association, a professional sports body in the UK
Resident welfare association, any self-organised group (particularly in India) which claims to represent the residents of a specified region
Romance Writers of America, a genre-specific writers association
Rot Weiss Ahlen, a football club in Ahlen, North Rhine-Westphalia, Germany
Royal West of England Academy, an art gallery and academy in Clifton, Bristol, UK
Royal West Academy, a secondary school in Montreal, Quebec, Canada

Science and technology
Reaction wheel assembly, in spacecraft control
Right-wing authoritarianism, a psychological personality variable
Rotating wave approximation, a mathematical simplification used in atom optics and magnetic resonance
Routing and wavelength assignment, a process in optical network routing

Other uses
Research Works Act, proposed US law (2011) to prohibit requiring free public access to results of federally funded research
Risk-weighted asset, a bank risk management variable usually used in the context of Basel II
RWA, abbreviation for Rwanda, an east-central African country
Ryan White Act (Ryan White CARE Act), US law providing assistance to people living with HIV/AIDS